Divine Gemini is an album of duets by vibraphonist Walt Dickerson and bassist Richard Davis recorded in 1977 for the SteepleChase label.

Reception

Allmusic gave the album 4 stars.

Track listing
All compositions by Walt Dickerson
 "Lucille" - 12:33		
 "Divine Gemini" - 4:02		
 "Always Positive" - 2:49		
 "Her Intuition" - 14:24

Personnel 
Walt Dickerson - vibraphone
Richard Davis - bass

References 

1978 albums
Walt Dickerson albums
Richard Davis (bassist) albums
SteepleChase Records albums